The 1950 New York Giants season was the franchise's 68th season. The team finished in third place in the National League with an 86–68 record, 5 games behind the Philadelphia Phillies.

Offseason 
 December 14, 1949: Sid Gordon, Buddy Kerr, Willard Marshall, and Red Webb were traded by the Giants to the Boston Braves for Eddie Stanky and Alvin Dark.
 Prior to 1950 season: Al Sima was purchased from the Giants by the Washington Senators.

Regular season

Season standings

Record vs. opponents

Opening Day lineup

Notable transactions 
 June 20, 1950: Willie Mays was signed as an amateur free agent by the Giants.

Roster

Player stats

Batting

Starters by position 
Note: Pos = Position; G = Games played; AB = At bats; H = Hits; Avg. = Batting average; HR = Home runs; RBI = Runs batted in

Other batters 
Note: G = Games played; AB = At bats; H = Hits; Avg. = Batting average; HR = Home runs; RBI = Runs batted in

Pitching

Starting pitchers 
Note: G = Games pitched; IP = Innings pitched; W = Wins; L = Losses; ERA = Earned run average; SO = Strikeouts

Other pitchers 
Note: G = Games pitched; IP = Innings pitched; W = Wins; L = Losses; ERA = Earned run average; SO = Strikeouts

Relief pitchers 
Note: G = Games pitched; W = Wins; L = Losses; SV = Saves; ERA = Earned run average; SO = Strikeouts

Farm system 

LEAGUE CHAMPIONS: Sioux City, Bristol, Lenoir, Oshkosh

References

External links
 1950 New York Giants at Baseball Reference
 1950 New York Giants at Baseball Almanac

New York Giants (NL)
San Francisco Giants seasons
New York Giants season
1950 in sports in New York City
1950s in Manhattan
Washington Heights, Manhattan